William Booth Gardner (August 21, 1936 – March 15, 2013) was an American politician who served as the 19th governor of Washington from 1985 to 1993. He also served as the ambassador of the GATT. A member of the Democratic Party, Gardner previously served as a member of the Washington State Senate, representing the 26th district from 1971 to 1973 and served as the Pierce County Executive prior to his tenure as governor. His service was notable for advancing standards-based education and environmental protection.

Early life, education, and early career
Gardner was born in Tacoma, Washington on August 21, 1936. He attended Clover Park Junior High in Lakewood, Washington before graduating from Lakeside School in Seattle. His parents divorced when he was very young; through his mother's remarriage he became an heir to the Weyerhaeuser fortune.  His mother and his sister, his only sibling, died in a plane crash when he was 14.

Gardner was a graduate of the University of Washington and Harvard Business School. His stepfather was Norton Clapp, one of the original owners of the Seattle Space Needle. Booth co-owned the Tacoma Tides, who played for one year in the American Soccer League in 1976. He was also a part-time soccer coach for various teams, including the Tacoma Cozars. In 1978, he co-owned the Colorado Caribous franchise in the NASL with Jim Guercio.

Governor of Washington (1985–1993)
In the 1984 Democratic primary for Washington state governor, Gardner defeated Jim McDermott.  In the general election he unseated Republican incumbent, John Spellman.  Gardner was easily elected to a second term in 1988 over state representative Bob Williams.  He chose not to seek a third term.

While governor, Gardner signed into law a health care program that provided state medical insurance for the working poor. He helped develop land-use and growth-management policies that made Washington an early environmental leader, steered hundreds of millions of dollars of increased spending toward state universities, increased standardized testing in public education, and improved legal protections for gay people.

On March 21, 1992, Gardner signed a measure that outlawed selling "obscene" music to minors in the state of Washington. The law went into effect on June 11 of that year, and make record store retailers and their employees criminally liable for selling such music to anyone under the age of 18.

Later years
In 1994, one year after his retirement, Gardner was diagnosed with Parkinson's disease. In 2006, he announced his support for assisted suicide. In 2008, he filed and successfully spearheaded the campaign for Initiative 1000, Washington's Death With Dignity Act, which was closely modeled on Oregon's assisted dying law; he remained involved in implementing the Act.  Gardner said that he supported going even further than the current Washington and Oregon laws, to eventually permit lethal prescriptions for people whose suffering is unbearable without the requirement that the sufferer have a terminal condition.

In 2009, The Last Campaign of Governor Booth Gardner, a short documentary film, was produced by Just Media and HBO, chronicling the Initiative 1000 campaign.  The film was nominated for an Academy Award for Best Documentary Short.

Gardner supported eliminating Washington's WASL test, a standardized test that was required to graduate high school. It was replaced in 2009 by the MSP for grades three through eight and the HSPE for grades eight through twelve.

Gardner died at his home in Tacoma, Washington on March 15, 2013, of Parkinson's disease. He was 76.

References

External links

Gardner, William Booth at HistoryLink
Booth Gardner entry at the National Governors Association
IMDB Entry for "The Last Campaign of Governor Booth Gardner"

|-

|-

|-

1936 births
2013 deaths
American soccer chairmen and investors
Businesspeople from Tacoma, Washington
Deaths from Parkinson's disease
Neurological disease deaths in Washington (state)
Democratic Party governors of Washington (state)
Euthanasia in the United States
Harvard Business School alumni
Lakeside School alumni
North American Soccer League (1968–1984) executives
Politicians from Tacoma, Washington
University of Washington alumni
Democratic Party Washington (state) state senators